Stevan Luković (born 16 March 1993) is a Serbian football midfielder who plays for Budućnost Dobanovci in Serbia.

Club career
After 3 season playing as a loaned player in Football club Sopot, which was reserve team of Red Star Belgrade when Vladan Lukić was a president, he returned in first team. But, he was 3rd, or 4th player on the same position, and he was loaned again, first to Kolubara and than to Grbalj. After return from Grbalj, he was licensed for Red Star, but didn't play. In 2014, contract was broken and he left the club as a free agent. He signed with Napredak Kruševac on 10 February 2014. He made his Jelen SuperLiga debut for Napredak Kruševac on 30 March 2014 against Spartak Subotica on Mladost Stadium. At the beginning of 2016, Luković joined Mladost Lučani.

References

External links
 
 Stevan Luković stats at utakmica.rs 
 

1993 births
Living people
People from Prokuplje
Serbian expatriate footballers
Association football midfielders
Serbian footballers
Red Star Belgrade footballers
FK Kolubara players
FK Sopot players
FK Zemun players
OFK Grbalj players
FK Napredak Kruševac players
FK Mladost Lučani players
FK Budućnost Dobanovci players
SV Lafnitz players
Montenegrin First League players
Serbian First League players
Serbian SuperLiga players
Expatriate footballers in Austria
Serbian expatriate sportspeople in Austria